Stepantsminda (formerly Kazbegi), is a townlet in the Mtskheta-Mtianeti region of north-eastern Georgia. Historically and ethnographically, the town is part of the Khevi province. It is the center of the Kazbegi Municipality.

Etymology
Stepantsminda was named after a Georgian Orthodox monk named Stephan, who constructed a hermitage at this location, as well as advicing people to relocate a little bit south in order to avoid the effect of regular snow avalanche.

Geography and climate
The town is located along the banks of the Terek River,  to the north of Tbilisi at an elevation of 1,740 meters (5,710 feet) above sea level. Stepantsminda’s climate is moderately humid with relatively dry, cold winters and long and cool summers. The average annual temperature is 4.9 degrees Celsius. January is the coldest month with an average temperature of -5.2 degrees Celsius while July is the warmest month with an average temperature of 14.4 degrees Celsius. The absolute minimum recorded temperature is -34 degrees Celsius and the absolute maximum is 32 degrees Celsius. Stepantsminda’s average annual precipitation is 790  mm. (31.1 inches). The town is dominated by large mountains on all sides. The most notable mountain of the region, Mount Kazbek of the Lateral Range, lies immediately to the west of town. The second most prominent peak, Mt. Shani, rises to an elevation of 4,451 meters (14,600 feet) above sea level, 9 kilometers to the east of Stepantsminda. The town is located 10 kilometers to the south of the famous Darial Gorge.

History

According to tradition, Stepantsminda, literally "Saint Stephan", was named so after a Georgian Orthodox monk Stephan, who constructed a hermitage at this location on what later became the Georgian Military Highway. It came under the control of a local feudal magnate, the Chopikashvili clan, who were in charge of collecting tolls on travelers in the area in the late 18th century. 

After the expansion of the Russian Empire into the Kingdom of Georgia in the early 19th century, the people of the region revolted against Russian rule. However, the local lord Gabriel Chopikashvili, son of Kazi-Beg, remained steadfast in his loyalty to Russia and helped to suppress the revolt. In return, he was promoted to officer in the Russian Army. He adopted the surname Kazbegi, and the village under his control was also frequently referred to as "Kazbegi". In 1917-1918 Stepantsminda was taken by Germany, Turkey and The Whites, bar the last who stayed until 1922.
The name was officially changed to Kazbegi under Soviet rule in 1925. Gabriel Chopikashvili-Kazbegi's grandson was the famed Georgian writer Alexander Kazbegi, who was born in this town. In 2006, the town reverted to its original name of Stepantsminda.

Attractions and sport facilities 

  Horse-riding
  Paragliding
  Bike-riding
  Gergeti Sameba Church
  Natural mineral waters
  Mount Kazbek climbing
  Glaciers
 Waterfall Gveleti

Landmarks
Stepantsminda is known for its scenic location in the Greater Caucasus mountains, and is a center for trekkers and mountain climbing. Local attractions include the Kazbegi Museum and Ethnographic Museum in town, and the Gergeti Trinity Church outside of town, as well as Mount Kazbegi itself and the alpine meadows and forests of the surrounding Kazbegi Nature Reserve.

Border crossing point to Russia

There is Georgian border crossing point "Larsi" to the Russian Federation approximately 12 kilometers to the North. The crossing was opened on 1 March 2010. 
It is open 24 hours. The customs are multilateral, for all citizens of the world. The cross-border road is in a mountain tunnel. It is not possible to cross the border on foot.

Infrastructure 
In December 2016 it was announced that AGH holding company plans to build an international airport in Stepantsminda. AGH founded "Aviator" company will provide Air Taxi service that will comprise individual charter flights to any airports in Georgia as well as to neighboring countries.

See also
 Mtskheta-Mtianeti

References

"Kazbegi." Georgian Soviet Encyclopedia. Vol. 10, Tbilisi, 1984, pp. 617
Rosen, Roger. Georgia: A Sovereign Country of the Caucasus. Odyssey Publications: Hong Kong, 1999.

External links

 Kazbegi Municipality. Mtskheta-Mtianeti Regional Administration website.

 Cities and towns in Mtskheta-Mtianeti
 Tiflis Governorate